Ten Bruggencate is a lunar impact crater that lies on the far side of the Moon from the Earth, just to the east of the younger crater Lane. To the southeast of Ten Bruggencate is Chauvenet.

This is a worn and eroded formation, with the satellite crater Ten Bruggencate H overlapping part of the side to the east-southeast. There are several small craterlets along the inner wall and the edges of the interior floor. The crater is otherwise relatively featureless and unremarkable.

Satellite craters
By convention these features are identified on lunar maps by placing the letter on the side of the crater midpoint that is closest to Ten Bruggencate.

References

 
 
 
 
 
 
 
 
 
 
 
 

Impact craters on the Moon